Murat Karalbiyevich Kumpilov  (Adyghe: КъумпӀылэ Мурат, Qump'ılə Murat; Russian: Мурат Каральбиевич Кумпилов, Murat Karalbievich Kumpilov; born on 27 February 1973) is a Russian politician and economist of Circassian origin who is currently serving as the head of the Republic of Adygea since 12 January 2017. He was previously prime minister of the republic, from 2008 to 2016.

Career
Murat Kumpilov was born in the village of Ulyap of the Krasnogvardeysky District in 
the Adyghe Autonomous Oblast on 27 February 1973. In 1989, he graduated from Ulyap secondary school number 9. In 1994, three years after the collapse of the Soviet Union, Kumpilov graduated from Rostov Institute of National Economy with a degree in "Economics and entrepreneurship". He became an engineer at Promagros Purchasing and Sales Association in Rostov-on-Don. In the same year, he was made Chief Auditor-Controller of the Krasnogvardeisky Office of the Federal Treasury of the Ministry of Finance of the Republic of Adygea. In 2008, Kumpilov was appointed as acting Deputy Prime Minister of the Republic of Adygea, and then promoted to acting Prime Minister. Later he was appointed Prime Minister of the Republic. On 19 September 2016, Kumpilov was elected as a member of the State Council of the Republic of Adygea. However, he was relieved of his duties in connection with his election as a deputy of the State Council. On 3 October 3, 2016, he was elected to the Chairman of the State Council of the Republic of Adygea. On 12 January 2017, after Aslan Tkhakushinov left his post, Russian president Vladimir Putin, appointed Kumpilov as the acting head of the Republic of Adygea. On 10 September 2017, the parliament of Adygea unanimously elected him as head of the republic. He was re-elected unanimously for a second term on 11 September 2022.

References

External links

United Russia politicians
Heads of the Republic of Adygea
1973 births
Living people
Circassian people of Russia
People from Krasnogvardeysky District, Adygea
Rostov State University of Economics alumni